Tamir Kahlon (born October 29, 1987, in Tel Aviv) is a retired Israeli footballer. Kahlon had to retire in 2013 following an injury while playing for Ironi Kiryat Shmona.

Career

Club
In August 2011, he was loaned to Cracovia on a one-year deal.

In January 2012, he was loaned to F.C. Ashdod on six-month deal.

References

External links
 

1987 births
Living people
Israeli footballers
Maccabi Tel Aviv F.C. players
Bnei Yehuda Tel Aviv F.C. players
F.C. Ashdod players
Hapoel Acre F.C. players
Hapoel Ironi Kiryat Shmona F.C. players
R. Charleroi S.C. players
Israeli Premier League players
MKS Cracovia (football) players
Ekstraklasa players
Israeli expatriate footballers
Expatriate footballers in Poland
Expatriate footballers in Belgium
Israeli expatriate sportspeople in Poland
Israeli expatriate sportspeople in Belgium
Footballers from Tel Aviv
Israeli people of Libyan-Jewish descent
Association football midfielders